The FTSE Global Equity Index Series is a series of stock market indices provided by FTSE Group. It was launched in September 2003, and provides coverage of over 16,000 stocks in 48 countries.

The series comprises various global and local indexes, including:

 FTSE Global Total Cap Index, a global index covering approximately 16,000 stocks from micro cap to large cap
 FTSE Global All Cap Index, a global index covering approximately 9,000 stocks from small cap to large cap
 FTSE All-World Index, a global index covering approximately 4,000 mid cap and large cap stocks
Several of the indices in the series are used by The Vanguard Group as bases of their mutual funds and ETFs.

Overview of indexes 
These are some of the most important indexes managed by FTSE:

FTSE All-World Index

The FTSE All-World index started in 1986 as the FT-Actuaries World Index.

The All-World series is sub-divided into three segments:
Developed
Advanced Emerging
Emerging Markets

The Base Date is December 31, 1986.

History
This index has been calculated since 31 December 1986, originally as the FT-Actuaries World Indices.

In 1995, Wood Mackenzie and Co., one of the original partners, sold its stake to Standard & Poor’s. The name of the index was changed to FT/S&P – Actuaries World Indices.

On 29 November 1999, FTSE International Limited acquired the stakes of Goldman Sachs and Standard & Poor’s. The name changed to the FTSE World Index series.

FTSE took exclusive rights to integrate the Baring Emerging Markets data series with its existing FTSE World Index series. This resulted in the creation of the FTSE All-World Index series on June 30, 2000.
The FTSE All-World Index was launched in the year 2000.

On September 22, 2003, FTSE introduced enhancements to improve the coverage of mid cap stocks in the index and remove some smaller stocks.

Countries/Regions 
The index includes companies in the following countries/regions:

 Australia
 Austria 
 Belgium 
 Brazil 
 Canada 
 Chile 
 China 
 Colombia 
 Czech Rep. 
 Denmark 
 Egypt 
 Finland 
 France 
 Germany 
 Greece 
 Hong Kong 
 Hungary 
 Iceland 
 India 
 Indonesia
 Ireland 
 Israel 
 Italy 
 Japan 
 Korea 
 Kuwait 
 Malaysia 
 Mexico 
 Netherlands 
 New Zealand 
 Norway 
 Pakistan 
 Philippines 
 Poland 
 Portugal 
 Qatar 
 Romania 
 Saudi Arabia 
 Singapore 
 South Africa 
 Spain 
 Sweden 
 Switzerland 
 Taiwan 
 Thailand 
 Turkey 
 UAE 
 UK 
 USA

Total annual returns

See also 

 MSCI World
 Stock market index
 Exchange-traded fund

References

FTSE Group stock market indices